Recurvaria cinerella is a moth of the family Gelechiidae. It is found on the Canary Islands.

The wingspan is about 6 mm.

References

Moths described in 1908
Recurvaria
Moths of Africa